Stretch & Vern are an English electronic music duo consisting of Stretch Silvester (Stuart Collins) and Jules Vern (Julian Peake).

Biography 
They are best known for the 1996 hit "I'm Alive", which prominently samples "Boogie Wonderland" by Earth, Wind & Fire.

"I'm Alive" was a huge success, reaching No. 6 on the UK Singles Chart, No. 2 on the US Billboard Hot Dance Club Play chart and No. 1 on the Swedish and UK Dance charts. The song gained popularity again in 2019 after a re-release of new mixes by Illyus & Barrientos, Prins Thomas and Wax Worx.

Their second single, "Get Up! Go Insane!", which samples Ithaka's "So Get Up" and House of Pain's "Jump Around", reached number 17 on the UK Singles Chart as well as also reaching number one on the UK Dance Singles Chart in 1997.

Discography

Singles

References

External links

English electronic music duos
DJs from London
DJ duos
Male musical duos
Musical groups established in 1993
FFRR Records artists
London Records artists
Musical groups from London
Electronic dance music duos
Record production duos